The Mint is a 2015 comedy film directed by Raymond Mamrak and starring JWoww, Kristinia DeBarge, Chris Cardillo and Ashlee Keating. The film is based on a story by Chris Cardillo and adapted into a screenplay by director Raymond Mamrak. Cardillo stars opposite MTV's Jersey Shore's reality star Jenni "JWoww" Farley, who also serves as the film's executive producer, a record executive trying to get his company back on track after the death of his parents.

Cardillo began developing the film in January 2014 and while J. Fontaine and the Jersey Mint Records actually exist, the film isn't based on actual events despite Cardillo's involvement. Mamrak was hired and replaced Samuel C. Morrison, Jr. as the screenwriter, in addition to serving as director, producer, and actor.

The Mint was filmed in New Jersey.

Plot
The Mint follows J. Fontaine (Cardillo), a record producer, in his downward spiral after his parents die and is left to run the family's once successful record label. Things become increasingly stressful and unbearable which causes Fontaine to push everyone away, especially his close friends and girlfriend, Vicki (JWoww). After relocating the recording company to New York City to be closer to where the action is. The little bit of money the label brings in is going fast and to make matters worse, Fontaine is losing all of his artists and friends in the process.

Eventually the only people left at the label are Peezy (Rashad Jackson) a happy-go-lucky one hit wonder and Melody (DeBarge) one of the label's artists who hasn't had a hit in a while, and his girlfriend Vicki, who has been helping as best as she can to keep the business going amidst J's breakdown in his desperate attempt to find the next big thing.

As the walls continue to cave in a country girl, Samantha Cole (Ashlee Keating) is the voice that Fontaine hears that lights a renewed fire inside of him that he knows will save the business. With a little help from his friends Fontaine tries to find the girl with the voice, save the label, and hopefully save himself in the process.

Cast
Jenni "JWoww" Farley as Vicky
Ray Mamrak as Barry
Chris Cardillo as J. Fontaine
Kristinia DeBarge as Melody
Brian Anthony Wilson as Ted Firestone
Raw Leiba as Reynaldo Stevens
Ashlee Keating as Samantha Cole

Soundtrack
A soundtrack for the film features music Rakim, Honey Cocaine, Kristinia DeBarge, Madeline Smith, J. Fontaine and more and was released by the Jersey Mint Records.

References

External links
 
 Official The Mint Movie Website

2015 films
2015 comedy-drama films
American comedy-drama films
2010s English-language films
2010s American films